This is a list of Dutch Academy Award winners and nominees. This list details Dutch films and Dutch people who have either been nominated for or won an Academy Award.

Best Actress in a Supporting Role

Best Animated Feature

Best Animated Short Film

Best Cinematography

Best Costume Design

Best Documentary Feature

Best Documentary Short

Best International Feature Film

Best Live Action Short Film

Best Makeup and Hairstyling

Best Picture

Best Production Design

Best Visual Effects

Best Writing – Adapted Screenplay

Special Awards

See also 

 List of Dutch submissions for the Academy Award for Best Foreign Language Film
 Cinema of the Netherlands
 List of Dutch films

References 

Netherlands
Academy Award winners
Academy Award winners